Hilarita is a former unincorporated community now incorporated in Belvedere and Tiburon in Marin County, California. It lies at an elevation of 13 feet (4 m).

References

Neighborhoods in Marin County, California